The final of the men's 4 × 100 metre freestyle relay event at the 1984 Summer Olympics was held in Los Angeles, California, on August 2, 1984. 23 teams participated in the heats, with the eight fastest qualifying for the final.

Records
Prior to this competition, the existing world and Olympic records were as follows.

The following new world and Olympic records were set during this competition.

Results

Heats
Rule: The eight fastest teams advance to the final (Q).

Final

References

External links
 Official Report
 USA Swimming

R
Men's events at the 1984 Summer Olympics